The Roman Catholic Diocese of Guanhães is a diocese located in the city of Guanhães in the Ecclesiastical province of Diamantina in Brazil.

History
 May 24, 1985: Established as Diocese of Guanhães from the Metropolitan Archdiocese of Diamantina, Diocese of Governador Valadares and Diocese of Itabira–Fabriciano

Bishops
 Bishops of Guanhães (Roman rite)
 Antônio Felippe da Cunha, S.D.N. (8 December 1985 Appointed - 5 Mar 1995 Died)
 Emanuel Messias de Oliveira (14 January 1998 Appointed - 16 February 2011 Appointed, Bishop of Caratinga, Minas Gerais) 
 Jeremias Antônio de Jesus (since 30 May 2012)

Other priests of this diocese who became bishops
Marcello Romano, appointed Bishop of Araçuaí in 2012
Jacy Diniz Rocha, appointed Bishop of São Luíz de Cáceres, Mato Grosso in 2017

References

 GCatholic.org
 Catholic Hierarchy
 Diocese website (Portuguese)

Roman Catholic dioceses in Brazil
Christian organizations established in 1985
Guanhães, Roman Catholic Diocese of
Roman Catholic dioceses and prelatures established in the 20th century
1985 establishments in Brazil